Thomas Pendleton Burnett (September 3, 1800 – November 5, 1846) was a United States politician in the Wisconsin Territory.

Biography
Burnett was born to John and Judith Burnett on September 3, 1800 in Pittsylvania County, Virginia. He pursued a career as a lawyer, and was present at the surrender of Black Hawk and the end of the Black Hawk War. On December 29, 1836, Burnett married Lucia Maria Brunson. In 1835 he served as president of the Seventh Michigan Territorial Council (the Rump Council). In 1838, Burnett ran for Wisconsin Territorial Congressional Delegate and lost. He then was appointed reporter of the Wisconsin Territorial Supreme Court. In 1845–1846, Burnett served in the Wisconsin Territorial House of Representatives of the Wisconsin Territorial Legislature. He then served in the first Wisconsin Constitutional Convention of 1846.

A Methodist, he married Lucia Maria Brunsom on December 29, 1836. Burnett died of "bilious fever" (typhoid fever) on November 5, 1846 in Grant County, Wisconsin. He had been called home to attend to his family, which was ill with the disease; his mother died a few days before him, and his wife a few hours after him. Burnett County, Wisconsin is named after him.

References

External links
 
The Political Graveyard

1800 births
1846 deaths
People from Pittsylvania County, Virginia
People from Grant County, Wisconsin
Methodists from Wisconsin
19th-century Methodists
American people of the Black Hawk War
Wisconsin lawyers
Members of the Michigan Territorial Legislature
Members of the Wisconsin Territorial Legislature
19th-century American politicians
Burials in Wisconsin
Deaths from typhoid fever
Wisconsin Democrats